Parliamentary elections were held in Hungary between 24 June and 3 July 1881. The result was a victory for the Liberal Party, which won 235 of the 413 seats.

Results

Parliamentary
Elections in Hungary
Hungary
Elections in Austria-Hungary
Hungary
Hungary

hu:Magyarországi országgyűlési választások a dualizmus korában#1881